The American Sociologist is a quarterly peer-reviewed academic journal covering sociology with special emphasis on topics of broad concern to the profession and the discipline. It was established in 1965 and published by the American Sociological Association until suspended in 1982. It resumed in 1987 when it was taken over by Transaction Publishers. Transaction sold its journal publishing program to Springer Science+Business Media in 2007.

Abstracting and indexing
The journal is abstracted and indexed in:

References

Further reading

External links

Sociology journals
Publications established in 1965
Springer Science+Business Media academic journals
English-language journals
Quarterly journals
Transaction Publishers books